Mitrasacme polymorpha is a common perennial herb found in eastern and southern Australia. Often found near the coast on sandy soils in heathland, though also found at higher altitudes.

It grows to 15 cm tall, leaves 4 to 15 mm long, 1 to 6 mm wide. Four petaled white flowers form in spring to summer, on umbels at the end of the hairy branches. The fruiting capsule is 2 to 3 mm in diameter.

References

Loganiaceae
Flora of New South Wales
Flora of Queensland
Flora of Victoria (Australia)
Flora of Tasmania